The 2004 ISF Men's World Championship was an international softball tournament. The final was held in Christchurch, New Zealand on 2 September 2004. It was the 11th time the World Championship took place. Fifteen nations competed, including defending champions New Zealand.

In the end, New Zealand won their third consecutive World Cup, over a win against runner-up Canada.

First round

Group A

Group B

Play Offs

Final

Final standings

External links
Final standings

References

ISF Men's World Championship
2004 ISF Men's World Championship
2000s in Christchurch
2004 in New Zealand sport
Men's Softball World Championship
Sports competitions in Christchurch
September 2004 sports events in New Zealand